Komorowo Żuławskie  is a village in the administrative district of Gmina Elbląg, within Elbląg County, Warmian-Masurian Voivodeship, in northern Poland.

The village has a population of 170.

References

Villages in Elbląg County